Noah Jeremy Arbit (born September 21, 1995) is an American politician who has served as a member of the Michigan House of Representatives since 2023. A member of the Democratic Party, Arbit represents Michigan's 20th House District, anchored in West Bloomfield Township, alongside Keego Harbor, Orchard Lake, Sylvan Lake, and portions of Commerce and Bloomfield townships. First elected in the November 2022 general election, Arbit is the youngest LGBTQ+ person ever elected to serve in the Michigan Legislature.

Early life and education 
Noah Arbit was born on September 21, 1995, alongside his fraternal twin brother, to parents Edie and Steve Arbit. Arbit was raised with his two brothers in West Bloomfield Township, and attended Bloomfield Hills Schools, including Lone Pine Elementary School, West Hills Middle School, and Andover High School, before completing high school at the Frankel Jewish Academy in 2013.

In 2018, Arbit graduated from Wayne State University with a Bachelor’s Degree in Comparative politics and Jewish studies. His undergraduate thesis, entitled “International Law and the Israeli Embassy and AMIA Bombings in Buenos Aires: Iranian Terrorism, Argentine Corruption, and the Birth of an International Cold Case”, was published by the Pennsylvania Undergraduate Law Review in Spring 2018.

Political career 
In 2016, Arbit took a semester off college to work for Hillary Clinton’s 2016 presidential campaign, leading the campaign’s organizing efforts in West Bloomfield, Commerce, and Milford townships in central-west Oakland County. He has cited Clinton’s loss in the 2016 election as a major turning point in his career, compelling him to shift focus from foreign affairs to local and state politics.

Following his graduation, Arbit worked as a staffer for Gretchen Whitmer’s 2018 gubernatorial campaign in Oakland County, and later, as a fundraiser for the Michigan House Democrats.

Following the 2018 terrorist shooting at the Tree of Life synagogue in Pittsburgh, and a perceived rise in antisemitism nationally, Arbit founded the Michigan Democratic Jewish Caucus, stating its mission to “elevate Jewish voices in the Michigan Democratic Party, combat antisemitism and extremism, and advocate for progressive policies to build a better, stronger, fairer Michigan.” As chair of the Michigan Democratic Jewish Caucus, Arbit was outspoken about the need to combat antisemitism in politics, and the importance of Jews running for office in Michigan. He was named to the Detroit Jewish News’ annual “36 Under 36” list in 2020 and 2022. 

In January 2021, Arbit was appointed Director of Communications for the Oakland County Prosecutor’s Office, serving under Prosecutor Karen McDonald. He organized the Office’s first-ever Racial Justice Advisory Council, as well as its first ever Pride celebration.

2022 Campaign 
In August 2021, prior to the completion of Michigan’s redistricting process, Arbit announced his candidacy for the Michigan House of Representatives, filing to run in an undetermined district anchored in his hometown of West Bloomfield. In his announcement, Arbit cited the urgency of combating rising hate crimes and extremism, as well as addressing Michigan’s mental health crisis.

On August 2, 2022, backed by record-breaking fundraising and endorsements from U.S. Representative Brenda Lawrence, local leaders, and organizations, including the Detroit Free Press, Arbit came first in a competitive, three-way Democratic primary for Michigan’s 20th House District, defeating West Bloomfield School District board member Ken Ferguson and former legislative staffer James Sklar by nearly 16 percentage points, with 7,180 votes (46.6%) to Ferguson’s 4,785 (31%), and Sklar’s 3,448 (22%).

On November 8, 2022, Arbit was elected to the Michigan House of Representatives in the 2022 General Election, defeating Republican Party nominee Albert Mansour with 56.6% of the vote to Mansour’s 43.4%. Arbit is only the second Democrat to represent a state house district comprising West Bloomfield and Commerce Townships since before the Civil War, and is the youngest openly gay person ever elected to the Michigan Legislature.

On December 4, 2022, Arbit was sworn in as State Representative by Michigan Supreme Court Justice Richard H. Bernstein at the Jewish Community Center in West Bloomfield. U.S. Representative Haley Stevens also participated in Arbit’s ceremony.

Personal life 
Arbit is Jewish; he and his family are congregants at Temple Israel in West Bloomfield. Arbit is also openly gay,  and has cited his experiences as a part of the Jewish and LGBTQ+ communities as compelling him to get involved in politics, to run for office, and particularly, to focus on strengthening Michigan’s hate crime laws.

Electoral History

See also

 Michigan's 20th House District
 Michigan House of Representatives
 2022 Michigan House of Representatives election
 Michigan Democratic Party
 West Bloomfield, Michigan

Notes

References

External links
 Campaign website
 Government website

1995 births
Living people
People from West Bloomfield, Michigan
Gay Jews
Jewish American state legislators in Michigan
LGBT state legislators in Michigan
Democratic Party members of the Michigan House of Representatives
Jewish American politicians
Jewish American people in Michigan politics
Gay politicians
American gay men
21st-century American politicians
21st-century American Jews
21st-century American LGBT people